Stride or STRIDE may refer to:

Computing
 STRIDE (security), spoofing, tampering, repudiation, information disclosure, denial of service, elevation of privilege
 Stride (software), a successor to the cloud-based HipChat, a corporate cloud-based collaboration tool
 Stride (game engine), a free and open-source 2D and 3D cross-platform game engine
 STRIDE (algorithm), an algorithm for identifying secondary structures in proteins
 Stride of an array, in computer programming
 Stride scheduling, a soft real-time scheduling algorithm 
 System to Retrieve Information from Drug Evidence, a United States Drug Enforcement Administration database used to track the prices of drugs obtained in sting operations

Music
 Stride (composition), a 2019 orchestral composition by Tania León
 Stride (music), a type of piano playing
 "Stride", a song by Avail from their 1992 album Satiate
 "Stride," a song by Canadian musician Hayden from his 1996 EP Moving Careful

People
 Stride (surname)

Other uses 
 Stride (gum), a chewing gum produced by Cadbury Adams
 Stride Rite Corporation, a footwear company 
 Strides, a British & Australian slang term for trousers
 Strides Pharma, a pharmaceutical company headquartered in India
 Stride, formerly K12, an online education company